Qahar Asi (September 26, 1956 – September 28, 1994) was a poet  and agriculturist from Afghanistan.

He was born in Malima in Panjshir province. 
He is considered to be Afghanistan’s most famous modern poet who has practiced both "New" and "Classic" poetry styles.

Asi died in Kabul when a rocket hit his home during the 1990s civil war. Like many other Afghanistani poets and writers of his time, Asi showed his concerns about the political and social situation of Afghanistan. His poetry is, sometimes, strongly influenced by the then socio-political developments in Afghanistan. His explicit expression of the situations caused him personal problems with the then regimes in Kabul. In his book Az Jazeera-y e Khoon, Asi expressed his concerns about the situation of his country during the rule of the Mujaheedin and the civil war.
Asi published a poetry book each year and wrote many poems with romantic and emotional contents. He also worked with Afghan singer Farhad Darya.

Personal life

Asi was born in the small village of Malima in the now Panjshir Province to an ethnic Afghan family. He studied agriculture at Kabul University. Asi was married to Meetra and had a daughter named Mahasti. Like many other people of Afghanistan from his time, Asi had to flee to Iran to save himself and his family from the destruction of the civil war. He chose Iran and arrived there in the spring of 1994. In his short stay in Mashhad, Asi worked intensively with Afghanistani Poets and published a book and many articles. He then had to go back to Afghanistan after being denied a residence permit in Iran. Shortly after returning to Kabul, he was killed by a rocket fired by Hisb e Islami Golbodeen Hekmatyaar.

Bibliography
Lala-yee baraye Malima
Maqama-ye Gol e Sori
Diwan-e Asheqana-ye Bagh
Ghazal-e Man wa Gham-e Man
Tanha Wali Hamisha
Az Jazeera-ye Khoon
Az Atash az Abrisham

References
 Kazem Kazemi on Qahar Asi, BBC Persian online, 20 September 2006 (Site visited on 30 September 2011)

20th-century Afghan poets
1956 births
1994 deaths
20th-century poets